Duboko (Serbian Cyrillic: Дубоко) is a village located in the Užice municipality of Serbia. In 2002, the village had a population of 847.

Užice
Populated places in Zlatibor District